Dastur is a surname. Notable people with the surname include:

Amyra Dastur (born 1993), Indian film actress
Françoise Dastur (born 1942), French philosopher
Firoz Dastur (1919–2008), Indian film actor and classical vocalist
Parzaan Dastur (born 1991), Indian actor and writer